David Sinclair (born 23 July 1990, in Glasgow) is a Scottish footballer who plays for East Kilbride Thistle as a midfielder.

Sinclair started his career with Livingston, and has also played for Ayr United, Airdrieonians, Clyde, Stirling Albion and Stenhousemuir. He has also played in Iceland for BÍ/Bolungarvík and Australia for Mackay Wanderers.

Career

Sinclair signed for Livingston aged 12. He helped the club win Second Division and Third Division championships. Sinclair left Livingston after the 2011–12 season. He signed for Ayr United on 20 June 2013.

He signed for Airdrieonians in the summer of 2013, leaving the club in January 2014. After leaving Airdrieonians Sinclair signed for Icelandic club BÍ/Bolungarvík. He soon left the club after realizing he'd have to work in a fish processing plant in the town as part of his contract.

On 8 July 2014, Sinclair signed for Clyde. He left the club on 10 January 2015. In October 2015, Sinclair signed a short-term deal with Scottish League Two side Stirling Albion.

On 13 November 2015, Sinclair signed for Irvine Meadow XI F.C. on loan until January 2016.

Sinclair had spells at Bo'ness United, Stenhousemuir, Caledonian Braves, Gartcairn and Cambuslang Rangers before signing for  East Kilbride Thistle in 2022.

References

External links

1990 births
Living people
Scottish footballers
Scottish Football League players
Scottish Professional Football League players
Footballers from Glasgow
Association football midfielders
Livingston F.C. players
Ayr United F.C. players
Airdrieonians F.C. players
David Sinclair
Clyde F.C. players
Stirling Albion F.C. players
Caledonian Braves F.C. players
Wanderers F.C. players
Irvine Meadow XI F.C. players
Bo'ness United F.C. players
Stenhousemuir F.C. players
Gartcairn F. A. Juniors players
Cambuslang F.C. players
East Kilbride Thistle F.C. players